Fábio de Souza Lago (born 13 March 1970) is a Brazilian actor, best known for his works in Elite Squad, Caras & Bocas, and Invisible City.

Filmography 
Films
2001: 3 Histórias da Bahia as Roupinol "Roupi"
2002: Nada Sério
2002: O Condomínio
2002: Uma Estrela para Ioiô
2003: The Middle of the World as Neguiça
2004: The Other Side of the Street as Alex
2003: No Elevador
2005: A Última do Amigo da Onça
2005: Noel - O Poeta da Vila as Ademar Casé
2005: Trabalho Noturno
2007: A Grande Família as Manguaça
2007: Elite Squad as Claudio Mendes de Lima (Baiano)
2007: City of Men as Ceará
2010: Malu de Bicicleta as Marido
2011: Assalto ao Banco Central as Caetano
2012: Xingu as Bamburra
2012: Totalmente Inocentes as Nervoso
2013: Nelson Ninguém as Pai do Nelson
2014: Irmã Dulce as Neco
2015: Operações Especiais as Moacir
2017: Entre Irmãs as Orelha
2017: Dona Flor e Seus Dois Maridos as Giovani
2019: Vai que Cola 2: O Começo as Tiziu

Telenovelas, series and miniseries
1998: Você Decide as Zé Gago
2002: O Quinto dos Infernos as Gonzaguinha
2004: A Grande Família as Manguaça
2004: Senhora do Destino as Florisvaldo
2005: Carandiru, Outras Histórias as Bom Cabelo
2005: A Diarista as Taxista
2005: Carga Pesada "Arara Una" as Traficante
2005: City of Men as Ceará
2005: Um Só Coração as Miro
2006: Alta Estação as Zenildo "Zen"
2006: Bang Bang as Tim Jones
2006: JK as Severino Gaúcho
2008: Faça Sua História as Cacildo
2009: Caras & Bocas as Fabiano Barros Ferreira
2010: S.O.S. Emergência as Enfermeiro Anderson
2011: Força-Tarefa as Zé do Carmo
2012: Cheias de Charme as Rivonaldo "Naldo" José Cordeiro de Jesus
2013: Louco por Elas as Juca da Pamonha
2013: O Canto da Sereia as Vavá de Zefa
2013: Tapas & Beijos as Palhares
2014: Mais Você as Super Chef - Himself
2014: Segunda Dama as Tito
2015: A Regra do Jogo as Oziel

Theater
1986: Pluft, o Fantasminha
1987: A Bruxinha Que Era Boa
1988: O Curumim Invisível
1988: Um Menino no Mundo da Lua
1989: Lampiaço Rei do Cangão
1989: O Rouxinol e o Imperador
1990: A Árvore dos Mamulengos
1990: Gabriela Cravo e Canela
1991: O Príncipe Medroso
1992: Dona Flor e Seus Dois Maridos
1992: Os Saltimbancos
1993: Canudos: A Guerra do Sem Fim
1993: Era no Dois de Julho
1993: O Casamento do Pequeno Burguês
1993: Zás-Trás
1994: Os Cafajestes
2000: Rei Brasil 500 anos
2001: Cambaio
2001: lunct, Plact, Zum
2002: A Missa dos Quilombos
2002: Os Meus Balões
2002: Um Pelo Outro
2003: D. João VI
2004: Havana Café
2004: O Muro
2007: A Hora e Vez de Augusto Matraga
2008: Hamlet - Laerte
2008: Os Cafajestes

Awards and nominations

References

External links

1970 births
20th-century Brazilian male actors
21st-century Brazilian male actors
Brazilian male film actors
Brazilian male stage actors
Brazilian male television actors
Living people
People from Ilhéus